Monika Cassens ( Thiere, born 28 February 1953) is a German former badminton player.

She started her career in Tröbitz. For this club she won 15 national titles. After her marriage to Claus Cassens, she changed to SG Gittersee, a badminton club in Dresden. During her career she won 101 international tournaments. She won 6 Polish Open titles in a row in women's singles and women's doubles, and six titles in mixed doubles. In 1990 she won the Malta International.

References 
René Born: 1957–1997. 40 Jahre Badminton in Tröbitz – Die Geschichte des BV Tröbitz e.V., self-published (1997), 84 pages. (Online version)
René Born: Badminton in Tröbitz (Teil 1 – Die Anfänge, die Medaillengewinner, die Statistik), self-published (2007), 455 pages
European results

1953 births
Living people
People from Uebigau-Wahrenbrück
People from Bezirk Cottbus
German female badminton players
Sportspeople from Brandenburg
20th-century German women
21st-century German women